Emerald Isle or Emerald Island or variation, may also refer to:

Places
 Emerald Isle (Northwest Territories), Canada
 Emerald Isle (Ontario), Canada; a village in Selwyn township, Peterborough county
 Emerald Isle, North Carolina, USA
 Emerald Island (phantom), a phantom island reported by some early explorers to lie between Australia and Antarctica
 St. John's Island, Egypt, also known as Zabargad or Emerald Island because of ancient peridot mines

Nicknamed
 Ireland, so referred to in the poem When Erin First Rose by William Drennan
 Kodiak Island, Alaska, USA
 Lesbos, Greece
 Montserrat, Caribbean
 Phú Quốc, Vietnam

Other uses
 Emerald Island (EP), by Caro Emerald
 "The Emerald Isle", comic opera by Sir Arthur Sullivan
 Emerald Isle (video game), 1984 computer game by Level 9
 Ulmus parvifolia 'Emer I', the Chinese elm cultivar called Emerald Isle.

See also

 
 
 
 
 Emerald (disambiguation)
 Isle (disambiguation)
MAny newcomer see this place as an anal cavern